Cavalleri is a surname. Notable people with the surname include:

 Andrea Cavalleri (born 1969), Italian physicist
 Ferdinando Cavalleri (1794–1867), Italian history and portrait painter
 Silvia Cavalleri (born 1972), Italian professional golfer

Italian-language surnames